The 1963–64 season was the 60th season of competitive football in Turkey.

Overview 
Fenerbahçe won their third top-flight title and Beşiktaş finished runners-up for the second time. Şeker won the first edition of the 2.Lig. Galatasaray won their second Turkish Cup in a row, with Altay finishing runners-up. The Turkish Football Federation claimed that the result of the Karşıyaka and Kasımpaşa match, which originally finished as a 4–0 win for Karşıyaka, was fixed beforehand. As a result, the TFF changed the win to a 0–3 loss for Karşıyaka. The change dropped Karsiyaka into the relegation zone, and they were relegated to the 2.Lig. Karşıyaka challenged the decision, and took the TFF to civil court. Two years later, the civil court overturned the TFF's ruling, and Karşıyaka were allowed to join the 1.Lig again in 1966–67.

The 2.Lig was created at the beginning of this season. The club consisted of thirteen clubs: four clubs relegated during the 1962–63 season (Karagümrük, Şeker, Vefa, and Yeşildirek), the top two clubs  from each of the Ankara, Istanbul, and İzmir professional leagues (Altındağ and Güneşspor (Ankara), Beylerbeyi and Sarıyer (Istanbul), İzmir Demirspor and Ülküspor). Adana Demirspor, Bursaspor, and Mersin İdmanyurdu also joined. The first placed team gained promotion to the 1.Lig, while the last placed team was relegated to their respective professional or amateur league.

Galatasaray reached the first round of the 1963–64 European Cup after beating Ferencvárosi TC in the preliminary round. They were knocked out by FC Zürich, who won a coin toss after the two sides drew their match. Fenerbahçe took Galatasaray's spot in the 1963–64 European Cup Winners' Cup because they had already qualified for the European Cup through their league finish. Fenerbahçe reached the quarter-finals, ultimately losing to Hungarian side MTK Budapest 0–1 in the third leg playoff match. Beşiktaş placed last in Group A of the 1963–64 Balkans Cup.

Awards 
Gol Kralı (Goal King)
Güven Önüt (Beşiktaş) – 19 goals

Honours

European qualification

Final league tables

1.Lig

2.Lig

Türkiye Kupası final 
First leg

Second leg

National team 
The Turkey national football team competed in three matches during the 1963–64 season. Their record was zero wins, two draws, and one loss.

References